Patrick O'Shaughnessy (born 29 January 1993) is a Finnish footballer who plays as a defender for Finnish club HPS.

Early life 
O'Shaughnessy was born in Riihimäki on 29 January 1993, the son of a Finnish mother and Irish father (Robert, a painter from Galway). He holds both Finnish and Irish citizenship. His younger brother Daniel is also a footballer who plays for HJK and the Finland national team.

Club career 
O'Shaughnessy made his Veikkausliiga debut on 15 April 2012, appearing as a starter against TPS. After being released in winter 2013, he signed for Pallokerho-35 in April 2014.

International career 
O'Shaughnessy has represented Finland at age-group level. In November 2013, he expressed an interest in playing for Ireland, stating that he felt "more Irish than Finnish". He said, "I think maybe it has to do with my personality and it would make my father very proud if I played for Ireland."

References

External links
 
  Profile at veikkausliiga.com

1993 births
Living people
People from Riihimäki
Finnish footballers
Finnish people of Irish descent
Association football defenders
Veikkausliiga players
FC Honka players
Helsingin Jalkapalloklubi players
Klubi 04 players
Myllykosken Pallo −47 players
PK-35 Vantaa (men) players
Nurmijärven Jalkapalloseura players
Sportspeople from Kanta-Häme